Chamaescilla is a genus of Australian herbs in the subfamily Hemerocallidoideae within the asphodel family. They have grass-like basal leaves and tuberous roots. The flowers have six petals (each with three nerves) and six stamens. The seed capsules contain black, glossy seeds.

Species
Four species were accepted :
Chamaescilla corymbosa (R.Br.) Benth. (Blue Stars, Blue Squill or Mudrurt) - Western Australia, South Australia, Victoria and Tasmania. 
Chamaescilla gibsonii Keighery  - Western Australia
Chamaescilla maculata R.W.Davis & A.P.Br. – Western Australia 
Chamaescilla spiralis (Endl.) Benth., which has curled basal leaves.  - Western Australia

Formerly included:
Chamaescilla dyeri - synonym of Arthropodium dyeri
(See Arthropodium.)

References

Hemerocallidoideae
Asphodelaceae genera
Asparagales of Australia
Endemic flora of Australia